Colin Morris may refer to:
Colin Morris (footballer) (born 1953), English former footballer
Colin Morris (Methodist minister) (1929–2018), formerly head of BBC religious broadcasting
Colin Morris (playwright) (1916–1996), British playwright, screenwriter and actor

See also
Morris (surname)